Aaron Douglas (born August 23, 1971) is a Canadian actor. He is best known for his role as Galen Tyrol on the Sci Fi Channel's television program Battlestar Galactica.

He headlined on the CTV drama The Bridge, which was also picked up by CBS for broadcast in the United States. Douglas played Frank Leo, a charismatic police union leader who is simultaneously battling criminals on the street while facing down corruption within the ranks of his own department. CBS ordered thirteen episodes, which began production in May 2009 but the series was dropped after just three episodes had been aired. Douglas starred alongside fellow Battlestar Galactica actor Paul Campbell in a Syfy original movie, Killer Mountain, which premiered August 27, 2011.

Early life
Aaron Douglas was born in New Westminster, a suburb of Vancouver, British Columbia. His father, Michael Douglas, is a professor and his mother, Arlene Elliot, is a psychologist. He has a brother Chris, who is four years his junior. The family lived in Vancouver until Douglas was 10, at which time they moved to a town in the interior of the province of British Columbia, Creston, where he attended Prince Charles Secondary School as a teenager and acted in school productions, played in a rock band and participated in community theater. At age 26, he quit his job and moved back to Vancouver to pursue a career in acting. He studied at Canada's famed William Davis Centre for Actors Study at VanArts.

After completing the program at VanArts, Douglas performed with the Okanagan Shakespeare Company in Canada. Many of his early acting jobs were the result of his work as a "reader" for auditions. His job was to read the other side of the dialogue for the person auditioning for a role. Often, after the audition was finished, the director would turn to him and say something like, "You know that cop role with three lines, do you want to do it?", he began building his resume off those small parts.

Personal life
On November 1, 2004, Douglas' wife Debbie died from breast cancer. He has a son, Taylor, from a previous relationship, born in 1996.

Douglas has a love of hockey and has been on skates since he was two years old. He still plays hockey as an adult, usually as a goalie. He is a Vancouver Canucks fan and can usually be found at home games screaming at the referees along with friends and fellow Sci-Fi alums Daniel Bacon, Dan Payne, and Ryan Robbins. He is also an avid fan of Wil Wheaton from Star Trek: The Next Generation. Aaron has admitted to going "fangirl" on him when meeting him for the first time at a convention in 2008. He is also a self-confessed fan of The Ricky Gervais Show.

Filmography

Film

Television

Video games

Awards and nominations
At the 2013 Canadian Screen Awards Douglas was nominated for best TV series dramatic guest performance for his role in the TV series Flashpoint, episode: "Day Game".

References

External links

1971 births
Living people
Canadian male film actors
Canadian male television actors
People from New Westminster
Male actors from British Columbia